Alessandra Maestrini (born May 17, 1977) is a Brazilian actress and singer-songwriter.

Biography
Alessandra was born in Sorocaba, Brazil, the daughter of Noêmia and Emílio Maestrini. Alessandra liked early music, literature and art in general. As a girl, she used to create scenes, write, sing, dance, draw and direct her friends.

Already living in Rio de Janeiro, she took a vacation course with Cláudia Jimenez and at age 11 she went to the Tablado. She began to study singing at the age of 15. A year later she performed with the Company of Daniel Herz and Suzanna Krueger. At the age of seventeen she won a theater and music scholarship to study at the University of Evansville, in Indiana, United States.

Returning to Brazil, she entered the cast of the award-winning musical "As Malvadas" by Charles Möeller and Cláudio Botelho. From then on she did not stop anymore, alternating works between theater, television and cinema.

Personal life 
In 2014, Alessandra declared herself to be bisexual in an interview to the magazine Caras.

Filmography

Television

Film

Stage

Discography

Tour

References

External links
 

1977 births
Living people
People from Sorocaba
Brazilian people of American descent
Brazilian people of Italian descent
Brazilian television actresses
Brazilian LGBT actors
Brazilian LGBT singers
Actresses from São Paulo (state)
University of Evansville alumni
21st-century Brazilian women singers
21st-century Brazilian LGBT people
Brazilian bisexual people
Bisexual actresses
Bisexual singers